Aasaeli Amone (born 8 January 1966), also known by the nickname "Asa", is a Tongan former dual code international rugby union and rugby league footballer.

Rugby union
Amone played four times for Tonga in 1987, including twice in the 1987 Rugby World Cup.

Rugby league
He played for Tonga in the 1995 Rugby League World Cup.

Asa Amone made his début for Featherstone Rovers on Sunday 1 February 1998, and he played his last match for Featherstone Rovers during the 1999 season.

First Division Grand Final appearances
Asa Amone was a playing interchange/substitute in Featherstone Rovers' 22-24 defeat by Wakefield Trinity in the 1998 First Division Grand Final at McAlpine Stadium, Huddersfield on 26 September 1998.
He also played for various clubs in New Zealand, and was noted for appearances for the Australian club Orange Hawks. In 2006 he joined the Qantas Cyms team.

As of 2011, he worked in a mine in Western Australia.

References 

1966 births
Living people
Dual-code rugby internationals
Expatriate rugby league players in England
Featherstone Rovers players
Halifax R.L.F.C. players
Rugby league centres
Rugby league fullbacks
Rugby league props
Rugby league wingers
Rugby union fly-halves
Tonga international rugby union players
Tonga national rugby league team players
Tongan expatriate rugby league players
Tongan expatriate sportspeople in England
Tongan rugby league players
Tongan rugby union players